The 1947 Iowa State Teachers Panthers football team represented Iowa State Teachers College in the North Central Conference during the 1947 college football season. In its tenth season under head coach Clyde Starbeck, the team compiled a 5–3–1 record (4–0 against NCC opponents) and tied for the conference championship.

Schedule

References

Iowa State Teachers
Northern Iowa Panthers football seasons
North Central Conference football champion seasons
Iowa State Teachers Panthers football